"Big Fish" is a song recorded by American rapper Vince Staples for his second studio album, Big Fish Theory (2017). It was released on May 18, 2017 by Blacksmith Records, ARTium Recordings and Def Jam Recordings. The song features vocals from Juicy J and produced by Christian Rich.

Reception and composition
"Big Fish" as produced by Nigerian/Chicago duo Christian Rich, featured as Pitchforks "Best New Track" with Sheldon Pearce deeming it as "a meditation on rap's transformative properties," saying it "engages with rap as a mechanism to escape poverty, evaluating the wealth gap between an emerging rapper’s past and present." According to Clash, Staples "not only reflects on his life prior to fame, but also address the problems that come with success." Spin stated the song takes cues from west coast funk.

Music video
The song's accompanying music video premiered on May 18, 2017 on Staples' Vevo channel on YouTube. The music video was directed by David Helman. In the video, Staples is "sitting on a sailboat that's slowly sinking into shark-infested waters. Despite the circumstances, Staples casually leans back and fires a few flares while he tears through the relentless "Big Fish"."

Charts

References

External links
Lyrics of this song at Genius

2017 singles
2017 songs
Vince Staples songs
Songs written by Vince Staples
Songs written by Juicy J
G-funk songs
Songs written by Kehinde Hassan
Songs written by Taiwo Hassan